Boris Ivanovich Shavyrin (also transliterated as Shavirin, Shavyirin) (1902, Yaroslavl – 1965) was a Soivet artillery and rocket engineer who developed the first air-augmented rocket, Gnom, or Gnome (installable on mobile complexes or large tanks), as well as many other Soviet mortars and rockets. He was the first Head and Chief Designer of KB Mashinostroyeniya.

See also 
 List of Russian inventors

References 
 Shavyrin's biography at the Great Soviet Encyclopedia 
 Gnom ICBM 

1902 births
1965 deaths
People from Yaroslavl
Soviet inventors
Soviet engineers